Gottlieb Eliel Saarinen (August 20, 1873 – July 1, 1950) was a Finnish-American architect known for his work with art nouveau buildings in the early years of the 20th century. He was also the father of famed architect Eero Saarinen.

Life and work in Finland

Saarinen was educated in Helsinki at the Helsinki University of Technology. From 1896 to 1905 he worked as a partner with Herman Gesellius and Armas Lindgren at the firm Gesellius, Lindgren, Saarinen. His first major work with the firm, the Finnish pavilion at the Paris 1900 World Fair, exhibited an extraordinary convergence of stylistic influences: Finnish wooden architecture, the British Gothic Revival, and the Jugendstil. Saarinen's early manner was later christened the Finnish National Romanticism and culminated in the Helsinki Central railway station (designed 1904, constructed 1910–14).

From 1910 to 1915 he worked on the extensive city-planning project of Munksnäs-Haga and later published a book on the subject. In January 1911 he became a consultant in city planning for Tallinn, Governorate of Estonia and was invited to Budapest to advise in city development. In 1912, a brochure written by Saarinen about the planning problems of Budapest was published. He was runner up behind Walter Burley Griffin in an international competition to design the new Australian capital city of Canberra in 1912, but the following year he received the first place award in an international competition for his plan of Reval. From 1917 to 1918 Saarinen worked on the city-plan for greater Helsinki. He also designed a series of postage stamps issued 1917 and the Finnish markka banknotes introduced in 1922.

After the divorce from his first wife, Mathilde (who then married Herman Gesellius), on March 6, 1904, Saarinen married his second wife, Louise (Loja) Gesellius, a sculptor in Helsinki, and the younger sister of Herman Gesellius. They had a daughter Eva-Lisa (Pipsan) on March 31, 1905, and a son Eero on August 20, 1910.

Move to the United States
Eliel Saarinen moved to the United States in 1923 after his competition entry for the Tribune Tower in Chicago, Illinois, won second place. While it was not built, the streamlined design inspired the architecture of many other skyscrapers. Saarinen first settled in Evanston, Illinois, where he worked on his scheme for the development of the Chicago lake front. In 1924 he became a visiting professor at the University of Michigan.

In 1925 George Gough Booth asked him to design the campus of Cranbrook Educational Community, intended to be an American equivalent to the Bauhaus. Saarinen taught there and became president of the Cranbrook Academy of Art in 1932. Among his student-collaborators were Ray Eames (then Ray Kaiser) and Charles Eames; Saarinen influenced their subsequent furniture design.

During 1929–34, Saarinen contributed product designs for the Wilcox Silver Plate Co. / International Silver Company in Meriden, Connecticut. His iconic tea urn (c. 1934) was first exhibited in 1934–35 at the Metropolitan Museum of Art in New York. Over the years, the tea urn has been widely exhibited, including in St. Louis Modern (2015–16) at the St Louis Art Museum, Cranbrook Goes to the Movies: Films and Their Objects, 1925–1975 at the Cranbrook Art Museum (2014–15)., and in 2005–07, in the touring exhibition Modernism in American Silver: 20th-Century Design, organized by the Dallas Museum of Art, which also traveled to the Smithsonian Institution in Washington, DC. In 1951–52, the tea urn was featured in the Eliel Saarinen Memorial Exhibition which traveled to multiple venues across the United States. In addition to Cranbrook, the Dallas Museum and the St Louis Museum, The British Museum in London and the Metropolitan Museum of Art also hold tea urn-related Eliel Saarinen designs.
 
Eliel Saarinen became a professor in the University of Michigan's Architecture Department.

His son, Eero (1910–1961), became one of the most important American architects of the mid-20th century, as one of the leaders of the International style. Saarinen's student Edmund N. Bacon achieved national prominence as Executive Director of the Philadelphia City Planning Commission from 1949 to 1970.

Eliel received the AIA Gold Medal in 1947.

Significant works

See also
 Eliel Square
 Saarinen Tower

References

Further reading 

A&E with Richard Guy Wilson, Ph.D.,(2000). America's Castles: Newspaper Moguls, Pittock Mansion, Cranbrook House & Gardens, The American Swedish Institute. A&E Television Network.

External links

 
1873 births
1950 deaths
20th-century American architects
20th-century Finnish architects
American Lutherans
Architects of Lutheran churches
Architecture educators
Art Nouveau architects
Cranbrook Academy of Art faculty
Currency designers
Fellows of the American Institute of Architects
Finnish emigrants to the United States
International style architects
Modernist architects
Naturalized citizens of the United States
People from Bloomfield Hills, Michigan
People from Mikkeli Province (Grand Duchy of Finland)
People from Rantasalmi
Recipients of the AIA Gold Medal
Recipients of the Royal Gold Medal
Taubman College of Architecture and Urban Planning faculty